Jeffrey Energy Center (Jeffrey EC) is a sub-bituminous coal-fired power plant located in Emmett Township, Pottawatomie County, seven miles (11 km) northwest of St. Marys, Kansas. Jeffrey EC is jointly owned by Westar Energy and Aquila Corp., both now wholly owned subsidiaries of Evergy, Inc., Kansas City, Missouri. Jeffrey EC is composed of three separate 800-MW units providing a name-plate energy center capacity of 2.16 gigawatts. Unit 1 began operation in 1978, unit 2 in 1980 and unit 3 in 1983.

Jeffrey EC is a typical modern coal-fired energy center. Its primary mission is to convert the chemical energy available from its Wyoming Powder River Basin sub-bituminous coal supply into electric energy.

History
Jeffrey EC came into operation during the late 1970s in the wake of an energy crisis created by a quadrupling of world oil prices.  Its inauguration in July, 1978 was heralded with a visit by Vice President Walter Mondale praising its use of domestic coal reserves at a time when many power stations were still using imported oil.  The opening ceremonies included a performance by the US Army Golden Knights parachute team, and the arrival of a special train carrying company officials and state dignitaries from Topeka, Kansas. 

The center was originally designed for four generating units, but was scaled back when the anticipated growth in demand for electricity did not materialize.  

The steam turbines and generators were imported from Germany.  The unit 2 intermediate pressure turbine had to be substituted by the unit 3 turbine when the original unit was lost on a ship that sunk while crossing the Atlantic Ocean.

As of December, 2007, Foundation Coal has shipped approximately 220,000,000 tons of Powder River Basin Coal to Jeffrey Energy Center.

Operation

Coal is delivered to Jeffrey EC by unit trains.

Jeffrey EC has the capacity to generate 1,857 MW of electrical power. 

Jeffrey EC is not located close to any large bodies of natural water.  Its cooling water supply comes from the Kansas River and two nearby wells.  

The overall thermal efficiency of the energy conversion is about 33%. About 1/3 of the coal's chemical energy is converted to electric energy.  The remaining 2/3 of the energy is rejected to the environment via cooling water evaporated as low-grade waste heat with poor thermodynamic availability. The waste heat comes from evaporation of cooling water after it is used to condense the highly purified, low temperature steam that exits the turbines after driving the electric power generator. The condensed steam is then recirculated (pumped) back to the high pressure boiler for re-use.

Other steam generating (nuclear, gas, coal, geothermal, and solar furnace) energy centers, like Jeffrey, operate their steam plant on the Rankine cycle.

According to Moyers and Company web site as of September 18, 2013 Jeffrey  EC ranked 12th of the 50 dirtiest American power plants and generated 14.7 million metric tons of carbon dioxide emissions in 2011.

See also
List of largest power stations in the United States

References

Energy infrastructure completed in 1978
Energy infrastructure completed in 1980
Energy infrastructure completed in 1983
Coal-fired power stations in Kansas
Buildings and structures in Pottawatomie County, Kansas
Evergy
1978 establishments in Kansas